Squads for the Football at the 1958 Asian Games played in Tokyo, Japan.

Group A

Head coach:  Lee Wai Tong

Head coach:

Head coach:

Head coach:

Group B

Head coach:  Antun Pogačnik

Head coach:  T. Shome

Head coach:  Milorad Mitrović

Group C

Head coach: Lai Shiu Wing

Hong Kong national team and Republic of China national team shared same fodder of players during pre-1971. Most, if not all, of the players playing in the Hong Kong football league. The ROC team practically the A-team, while Hong Kong practically the B-team, with lesser quality of players.

Head coach:  Ramon Echevarria Sr.

Head coach:  Taizo Kawamoto

Group D

Head coach:  Kim Keun-chan

Head coach:  Moshe Varon

Head coach:

Head coach:  József Mészáros

References

External links
https://web.archive.org/web/20150524232202/http://rdfc.com.ne.kr/int/skor-intres-1948.html

Squads
1958